Anderson County is the name of five counties in the US:
Anderson County, Kansas
Anderson County, Kentucky
Anderson County, South Carolina
Anderson County, Tennessee
Anderson County, Texas